The stripe-breasted rhabdornis (Rhabdornis inornatus), also known as the stripe-breasted creeper or plain-headed creeper, is a species of bird currently placed in the starling family, Sturnidae. It is endemic to the southern and central Philippines. The Visayan rhabdornis (R. rabori) is now usually considered a distinct species, where previously it was considered a subspecies. The grand rhabdornis (R. grandis) of Luzon Island is sometimes regarded as a subspecies, but usually now considered a distinct species as well.

References

stripe-breasted rhabdornis
stripe-breasted rhabdornis
Taxonomy articles created by Polbot